Galfrid or Galfred (Latinised as  or ) is an Anglo-Norman variant of the name Geoffrey. Variants, also used as synonymous with Gottfried, include Italian  and Middle French  (Latin ).

The Anglo-Norman and British versions addressed here may refer to:

In patrial names 
 Galfredus Malaterra fl. 1097, a chronicler in Normandy; a.k.a. Goffredo Malaterra, Geoffroi Malaterra, Gaufredi Malaterræ, and Galfredus bendictinus e Normandia, and frequently cited by scholars of the early Middle Ages
 Geoffrey of Monmouth (c. 1095 – c. 1155), an Anglo-Norman writer; a.k.a. Galfredus Monemutensis, Galfridus Arturus, or Gruffudd ap Arthur
 Galfridus de Northcote (fl. 1103), English knight, progenitor of the Northcote baronets and earls of Iddesleigh, in Devon
 Godfrey of Saint Victor (c. 1125 – c. 1195), a French monk and theologian of the Victorine school; a.k.a. Galfredus, Geoffroy, Godefridus
 Geoffrey of Canterbury (fl. 1127–1154) Anglo-Norman Benedictine monk, an Abbot of Canterbury (England), later first Abbot of Dumfermline (Scotland); a.k.a. Galfridus
 Geoffrey of Wells (fl. 1150), an English hagiographer; a.k.a. Galfridius [de] Fontibus
 Galfridus Arbalastarius, 'Geoffrey the Crossbowman' (fl. 1189), a Norman soldier, first Lord of Preesall-with-Hackensall in Lancashire, England
 Geoffrey of Vinsauf (fl. 1200), an English grammarian, author of Poetria nova
 Galfrid de Camville (fl. 1200–1220), founder of the Priory of Cahir, a monastic house in County Tipperary, Ireland
 Galfridus (fl. 1203–1209), Abbot of Dryburgh and later of Alnwick Abbey, England; a.k.a. Geoffrey
 Galfridus de Bristollia (fl. 1213–1228), an English cleric; served as a magister to Henry de Loundres in Dublin; Ireland
 Geoffrey de Liberatione (fl. 1219 – 1249), a Scottish bishop; a.k.a. Galfredus or Galfred de Libertione
 Galfridus Martel (fl. 1242), an Anglo-Norman land-holder, namesake of Marlston (originally Marteleston), in Berkshire, England
 Galfrid de Mowbray (fl. c. 1250), a son-in-law of John I Comyn, Lord of Badenoch in Scotland
 Galfrid de Caunville (fl. ca. 1270–1290), an Anglo-Norman knight, and signatory to the Laugharne Charter in Carmarthenshire, Wales
 Galfridus de Coker (fl. 1301), a prior of Kidwelly Priory, Wales
 Galfrid de Burdon (fl. 1303–1321), a prior of Durham (and earlier of Finchale), England; a.k.a. Geoffrey de Burdon
 Galfridus de Wolvehope (fl. 1305), an English parliamentarian, briefly representing the constituency of Lewes in East Sussex, in the House of Commons
 Galfridus de Wilford (fl. 1321), a rector of St Nicholas' Church, Nottingham, England, and later of the Blackwell Church, Diocese of Lichfield (in England and partly in Wales)
 Galfredus Petrus of Bayeux (fl. 1524), a French monk, and author of Opus sane de deorum dearumque gentilium genealogia, the first work printed by Thomas Berthelet, later King's Printer for Henry VIII of England

As a given name after the development of surnames 
 Galfridus Walpole (1683–1726), British naval officer and politician from Houghton in Norfolk
 Galfridus Williams (fl. 1701), a curate of St Mary's Church, Sandbach, in Cheshire, England
 Galfridus Mann (fl. 1750), an army clothier of Kent, England; brother of Sir Horace Mann, 1st Baronet, and father of Sir Horatio Mann, 2nd Baronet, and of Catherine Mann, wife of James Cornwallis, 4th Earl Cornwallis
 Galfred Congreve (fl. 1850–1881), Scottish amateur footballer and cricketer, later a civil servant
 Galfrid C. K. Dunsterville (1905–1988), a Venezuelan botanist, assigned the botanical author abbreviation "Dunst."

In fiction 
 Galfrid, a character in The Amazons: A Farcical Romance, an 1893 British play by Arthur Wing Pinero
 Galfred, Santa Claus's bookkeeper in the 2008 American children's television movie Snow 2: Brain Freeze

See also 
 Phyllocoma, a genus of sea snails, with the junior synonym Galfridus
 Geoffrey, Geoffroy (surname), Jeffrey, Jeffries, Jeffers
 Godred/Guðrøðr
 Gofraid/Goraidh
 Gottfried, Godfrey, Godefroy, Goffredo
 Gruffudd/Gruffydd, Griffith (name), Griffith (surname), Griffiths

Given names